Nyanzapithecus pickfordi is an extinct species of primate from the Middle Miocene of Maboko Island, Nyanza Province, Kenya.

Taxonomy
Fifteen cranio-dental specimens of this species were collected from the island between the years 1933-73.

During an expedition to Maboko Island in 1982–83, paleoanthropologist Martin Pickford recovered more than a hundred small catarrhine fossils.  Among them,  described the new genus and species Nyanzapithecus pickfordi, characterized by several dental specializations, and also transferred the Rangwapithecus species R. vancouveringi to the genus renaming it N. vancouveringorum.  Nyanzapithecus was considered closely related to Rangwapithecus and Mabokopithecus based on dental similarities, and an early relative of Oreopithecus bambolii.  Nyanzapithecus was originally included in Oreopithecidae before being transferred to Proconsulidae.   described a new species, N. harrisoni, from Nachola, Kenya.

 considered Mabokopithecus clarki congeneric and even conspecific with N. pickfordi and thus renamed the latter Mabokopithecus pickfordi/clarki and Kunimatsu's species M. harrisoni.

Dental morphology
Nyanzapithecus pickfordi has a dental formula of 2:1:2:3 on both the upper and lower jaw. The upper premolars  were long and had buccal and lingual cusps which resembled each other in size the lower molars had deep notches.  Based upon dental morphology this was a folivorous species.

Notes

References

 
 
 
 
 
 

Miocene primates of Africa
Fossil taxa described in 1986
Prehistoric primate genera